Lake Dexter, which is somewhat apostrophe shaped, is a natural freshwater lake in southeast Winter Haven, Florida. This lake has a  surface area. It is bounded on the east and northeast by residences, on the north by commercial property, on the northwest by residences and along its entire southwest and southern shore area by grassland. A partially completed and abandoned residential project is in the grassland at the very south side of Lake Dexter. Parts of the shore around the lake are lined by swampy areas.

Possibly the south and southeast shores of Lake Dexter border on publicly owned land. If this is public land, it is the only place the public could fish from the shore. At any rate the lake has only boat access from private boat ramps and docks and it has no public swimming areas. The Hook and Bullet website says Lake Dexter contains largemouth bass, bluegill and crappie.

LEGOLAND Beach Retreat
Announced  March 15, 2016, LEGOLAND will be building a village-style, lakefront resort that will feature 83 single-story duplex units, offering 166 separate accommodations that sleep up to five. This addition opened mid 2017. The property, currently a grassy expanse on the western shore of Lake Dexter, is bordered by Register Road, which extends east from Legoland's main entrance and splits into a north–south road running behind Winter Haven Square.

References

Lakes of Polk County, Florida